Fallada may refer to:

 Hans Fallada, born: Rudolf Wilhelm Friedrich Ditzen (1893–1947), German writer
 Hans Fallada Prize (German literary prize given by the city of Neumünster
 14025 Fallada, main-belt asteroid
Fallada: The Last Chapter, 1988 German film